The International Fingerprint Research Group (IFRG) is forensic identification researcher group that gather together to exchange scientific knowledge in forensic identification.

The IFRG is regrouping the most active researchers in the world in the forensic identification field and was founded in September 1974. IFRG conferences are attended through personal invitations only.

Foundation and principles
The International Fingerprint Research Group (IFRG) is regrouping every second year to discuss and investigate various aspects of fingermark evidence, including development techniques and fingerprint identification. The IFRG strives to gather together researcher under the Gordon Research Conferences principles, encouraging formal and informal exchanges, where international representatives present and discuss frontier research in the biological, chemical, and physical sciences, and their related technologies.  It also support integration of young scientist in the field.

Conferences

 1974 - London, UK
 1984 - London, UK
 1987 - Quantico, USA
 1988 - Washington D.C., USA 
 1991 - Washington D.C., USA
 1993 - Washington D.C., USA
 1995 - Ne’urim, Israel
 1996 - Hertfordshire, UK
 1999 - Ottawa, Canada 
 2001 - Naurod, Germany
 2003 - Hertfordshire, UK
 2005 - The Hague, The Netherlands
 2007 - Canberra, Australia
 2009 - Lausanne, Switzerland
 2011 - Linköping, Sweden
 2013 - Jerusalem, Israel
 2015 - Patiala, India
 2017 - Beijing, China
 2019 - Sheffield, UK

Documentation produced 

The IFRG produce the following documentation:

 “Guidelines for the Assessment of Fingermark Detection Techniques,” Journal of Forensic Identification, vol. 64, pp. 174–200, 2014.

See also 
 Forensics

References 

 The International Fingerprint Research Group

External links
 IFRG Website

Forensics organizations
Criminal investigation
Organizations established in 1974
International scientific organizations